The 2014 Slough Borough Council election took place on 22 May 2014 to elect members of Slough Borough Council in England. This was on the same day as other local elections.

The whole council (42 seats) was up for election due to a re-drawing of boundaries and an increase from 41 councillors.

After the election, the composition of the council was:

Labour             33
Conservative  8
UKIP            1

References

2014 English local elections
2014
2010s in Berkshire